Erkki Risto Olavi Pajari (born 1933) is a Finnish diplomat. He is a lawyer by education and has served as a negotiating officer in the  Ministry for Foreign Affairs from 1979 to 1982 and Finnish Ambassador to Bogota from 1982 to 1985, in Alger from 1985 to 1987 and in Tunis from 1985 to 1987

References 

Ambassadors of Finland to Colombia
Ambassadors of Finland to Algeria
Ambassadors of Finland to Tunisia
1933 births
Living people